The 1838 Ohio gubernatorial election was held on October 9, 1838.

Incumbent Whig Governor Joseph Vance was defeated by Democratic nominee, former prosecuting attorney for Belmont County, Wilson Shannon.

General election

Results

References

1838
Ohio
Gubernatorial